Catac District is one of ten districts of the Recuay Province in Peru. Its seat is Catac.

Geography 
The southern part of the Cordillera Blanca traverses the district. Some of the highest peaks of the district are listed below:

See also 
 Kiswar
 Qiruqucha
 Qishqiqucha

References

Districts of the Recuay Province
Districts of the Ancash Region